SC 39 or variants may refer to:

 South Carolina Highway 39
 USS SC-39 - USS Submarine Chaser No. 39
 Scandium-39 (Sc-39 or 39Sc), an isotope of scandium